Sir William Acton, 1st Baronet (1570 – 22 January 1651) was an English merchant and Royalist who was Lord Mayor of London in 1640.

Acton was the son of Richard Acton, a London merchant, and Margaret Daniel. He was apprenticed by the Merchant Taylor Company in 1593 and freed in 1601. On 12 February 1628, he was elected an alderman of the City of London for Aldersgate ward. That same year, he was Sheriff of London.  He was created a baronet on 30 May 1629.

In 1640, Acton was due to be elected Lord Mayor of London but in an unprecedented vote he was passed over because of his strong Royalist views. Edmund Wright was voted in as the compromise candidate.
 
Acton married firstly Anne Bill, daughter of James Bill of Ashwell, Hertfordshire, and secondly Jane Johnson Bird, widow of Sir William Bird.  Acton's daughter and sole heiress, Elizabeth, brought great wealth to the Whitmore family upon her marriage to Sir Thomas Whitmore, 1st Baronet. The baronetcy became extinct on Acton's death.

References

1570 births
1651 deaths
Sheriffs of the City of London
17th-century lord mayors of London
Baronets in the Baronetage of England
Arnos Grove